The Water Boatman is a 2016 British horror and thriller film directed by Chris R Wright. The film stars Charlie Mills as failed musician, Neil, along with Rachel Teate as Liv and the voice of Big Brother, Marcus Bentley.

Plot

The British chilling story is set in present times. Having recently moved into their first home together, Neil, a failed musician turned florist returns to the house to find his girlfriend acting strange. The night slowly takes an unexpected turn, as Neil's world is turned upside down, as he struggles to keep both Liv and his sanity.

Cast
 Charlie Mills as Neil
 Rachel Teate as Liv
 Marcus Bentley as Spool
 Samuel Rix as Will
 Hannah Emmett as Sarah

References

External links
 

2016 films
British horror films
British thriller films
Films set in the 2000s
Films shot in England
Films set in England
2010s English-language films
2010s British films